The 25th national football championship in Vietnam known locally as the Vietnam National A1 Football Cup was played from March 1981 until April 1982.

17 clubs participated in this edition, including top 14 teams of the previous season, 2 newly-promoted teams and Thể Công (Câu lạc bộ Quân đội) returned after the absence in 1980 due to internal reasons.

17 teams took part in the competition that was played in two stages; a Group Stage featuring 2 groups of 9 and 8 teams and a Championship stage featuring the top three from each group. Two teams would be relegated, one from each group

Group stage
Top three advanced to the Championship stage.
Bottom placed teams in each group automatically relegated

Group A

Group B

Championship stage

Vietnamese Super League seasons
1981 in Vietnamese football
1982 in Vietnamese football
Viet